Oleg Germanovich Artemyev (born December 28, 1970) is a Russian Cosmonaut for the Russian Federal Space Agency. He was selected as part of the RKKE-15 Cosmonaut group in 2003. He was a flight engineer of Expedition 39 and 40 to the International Space Station, in 2018 he returned to space as the Commander of Soyuz MS-08, and in 2022 he returned to space as the Commander of Soyuz MS-21.

Personal life and education
Artemyev was born in Riga, Latvian Soviet Socialist Republic, present-day Latvia, on December 28, 1970, and grew up in Leninsk (now Baikonur), Kazakhstan.

He graduated from the Tallinn Polytechnical School in 1990. In 1998, he graduated from Bauman Moscow State Technical University with a degree in Low Temperature Technology and Physics. Artemyev graduated from the Russian Academy of State Service under the President of the Russian Federation in 2009, specializing in Personnel Management.

He is married to Anna Sergeevna Malikhova.

Career
After his graduation, Artemyev served in the Soviet Army in Vilnius, Lithuania, until 1991. He has worked at RKKE since 1998. At RKKE he was involving in developing testing procedures for Extra-vehicular Activity (EVA) equipment in neutral buoyancy at the hydrodynamics laboratory, Yuri Gagarin Cosmonaut Training Center. Artemyev was a member of the pre-launch processing team of the Zvezda Service Module working on the EVA and teleoperation control system. In 2000, he received medical clearance to begin special training related to space flight operation.

Cosmonaut career
Artemyev was selected as part of the RKKE-15 Cosmonaut group on May 29, 2003. In the following years, he entered Soyuz and ISS specific training. In 2006, together with American astronauts Michael Barrat and Sandra Magnus, Artemyev completed survival training as part of Soyuz training procedures. Again in June 2006, Artemyev, Yuri Lonchakov and Oleg Skripochka completed emergency water training in Sevastopol followed by another session of survival training with Sergei Revin and space tourist Charles Simony in January 2007. In 2008, he was part of a testing campaign of the Orlan-MK space suit.

As part of the Soyuz Processing Team, Artemyev worked at the Baikonur Cosmodrome in 2010 and 2011. He was the descent module operator for the Soyuz TMA-01M mission. He also processed the Soyuz TMA-21 spacecraft that launched in 2011.

Artemyev also has a personal vlog on YouTube where he films the daily life on the ISS.

MARS-500
Artemyev was a crew member in the 15-day and 105-day precursor studies of the MARS-500 program between 2007 and 2009.

Expedition 39/40
Artemyev was a member of the Expedition 39/Expedition 40 long-duration International Space Station crew. The mission launched on a Soyuz rocket from the Baikonur Cosmodrome, Kazakhstan, on March 25, 2014, and returned to Earth on September 11, 2014.

Expedition 55/56
Artemyev launched on March 21, 2018 as part of Expedition 55/56. He was the Commander of Soyuz MS-08. He returned to Earth on October 5, 2018.

Expedition 66/67
Artemyev launched for the third time on March 18, 2022 on board Soyuz MS-21. He joined the International Space Station Expedition 66 and is planned to become part of the Expedition 67 crew. Later in Expedition 67, he assumed the command of the International Space Station from Thomas Marshburn on 5 May 2022. He spent 195 days in space before returning back to earth on 29 September 2022 at 10:57 UTC.

References

External links

Personal blog of Oleg Artemyev (in Russian)
Personal blog of Oleg Artemyev (English mirror)
Personal vlog of Oleg Artemyev on YouTube
Biography on Spacefacts.de
Biography on Spaceflight101

Oleg Artemyev at Instagram

1970 births
Living people
Russian cosmonauts
Engineers from Riga
Deputies of Moscow City Duma
Heroes of the Russian Federation
Spacewalkers
Bauman Moscow State Technical University alumni